The Northern Ireland Squadron was a unit of the British Royal Navy. It was established during the conflict in Northern Ireland known as the Troubles to interdict the movement by sea of illegal arms for paramilitaries and to provide other material support for anti-terrorist operations in Northern Ireland. It existed from 1969 to 1998.

History
In 1969 the Royal Navy established the Northern Ireland Squadron which was deployed during The Troubles [1969–1998] to prevent paramilitary organisations moving illegal arms by sea and to support anti-terrorist operations in the province. In 1993 the squadron was moved to HM Naval Base Clyde, aka Faslane Naval Base, Scotland. The squadron's disbandment was announced on 23 March 2005 as part of the process of normalization which follows the 1998 Good Friday Agreement.

Components

Notes

References
 Royal Navy page on HMNBC redirects to Royal Marines front page
 page on River-class ships
 page on Hunt-class ships, mentioning NIS
 Navy News article on decommissioning dead link
 page includes photos of last NIS ships dead link

Royal Navy squadrons
The Troubles (Northern Ireland)
Military of Northern Ireland
Military units and formations disestablished in 2005